Rugg is a surname. Notable people with the surname include:

Gordon Rugg, Scottish academic
Harold Rugg, educational reformer
Paul Rugg, American screen writer
Peter Rugg, fictional character
Sylvanus T. Rugg, American Union Army officer
William Rugg, English theologian and bishop